Aleksandr Potapov may refer to:

 Aleksandr Potapov (statesman)
 Aleksandr Potapov (sailor)
 Aleksandr Potapov (actor)
 Aleksandr Potapov (chess player)